Sergei Rachmaninoff's Piano Concerto No. 3 in D minor, Op. 30, was composed in the summer of 1909. The piece was premiered on November 28 of that year in New York City with the composer as soloist, accompanied by the New York Symphony Society under Walter Damrosch. The work has the reputation of being one of the most technically challenging piano concertos in the standard classical piano repertoire.

History
Rachmaninoff composed the concerto in Dresden completing it on September 23, 1909. Contemporary with this work are his First Piano Sonata and his tone poem The Isle of the Dead.

Owing to its difficulty, the concerto is respected, even feared, by many pianists. Josef Hofmann, the pianist to whom the work is dedicated, never publicly performed it, saying that it "wasn't for" him. Gary Graffman lamented he had not learned this concerto as a student, when he was "still too young to know fear".

Due to time constraints, Rachmaninoff could not practice the piece while in Russia. Instead, he practiced it on a silent keyboard that he brought with him while en route to the United States. The concerto was first performed on Sunday, November 28, 1909, at the New Theatre in New York City. Rachmaninoff was the soloist, with the New York Symphony Society with Walter Damrosch conducting. The work received a second performance under Gustav Mahler on January 16, 1910, an "experience Rachmaninoff treasured". Rachmaninoff later described the rehearsal to Riesemann:

The score was first published in 1910 by Gutheil. Rachmaninoff called the Third the favorite of his own piano concertos, stating that "I much prefer the Third, because my Second is so uncomfortable to play." Nevertheless, it was not until the 1930s and largely thanks to the advocacy of Vladimir Horowitz that the Third concerto became popular.

Instrumentation
The concerto is scored for solo piano and an orchestra consisting of 2 flutes, 2 oboes, 2 clarinets in B-flat, 2 bassoons, 4 horns in F, 2 trumpets in B-flat, 3 trombones, tuba, timpani, bass drum, snare drum, cymbals, and strings.

Structure

The work follows the form of a standard piano concerto, constructed into three movements. The end of the second movement leads directly into the third without interruption. 

Rachmaninoff, under pressure, and hoping to make his work more popular, authorized several cuts in the score, to be made at the performer's discretion. These cuts, particularly in the second and third movements, were commonly taken in performance and recordings during the initial decades following the concerto's publication. More recently, it has become commonplace to perform the concerto without cuts. A typical performance of the complete concerto has a duration of about forty minutes.

In popular culture
The concerto is significant in the 1996 film Shine, based on the life of pianist David Helfgott.

References

Sources

Further reading

External links

Rachmaninoff's Works for Piano and Orchestra An analysis of Rachmaninoff's Works for Piano and Orchestra including the Piano Concertos and the Paganini Rhapsody

Piano concerto 3
1909 compositions
Compositions in D minor
Music dedicated to ensembles or performers